SkyMesh is an Australian telecommunications carrier and ISP owned by Bigblu Broadband that provides NBN, Wireless and Satellite services, as well as legacy IPSTAR Satellite services. SkyMesh is headquartered in Fortitude Valley, Brisbane.

History 
SkyMesh was founded in 2005 in Brisbane, Queensland to provide connectivity to consumers and businesses in remote parts of Australia.

Timeline
2005 - SkyMesh founded. The company rolled out a fixed wireless network (FWA) in the Gympie and Sunshine Coast regions that provided 2Mbit/s speeds.
2007 - Started offering IPSTAR satellite services that provided 4Mbit/s speeds.
2011 - Began offering satellite services over nbn’s interim satellite network, with 6Mbit/s services
2012 - Launched fixed wireless access (FWA) services over nbn’s network, providing 12Mbit/s services, later upgraded to 25Mbit/s. 
2016 - Started offering satellite services over nbn’s Sky Muster satellite network, providing 25Mbit/s services. SkyMesh was acquired by Satellite Solutions Worldwide Group (now Bigblu Broadband), along with Breiband.no for A$20.4 million.
2018 - Sold fixed line business (approx. 11,000 customers) to Superloop for A$1.5m (US$1.1m) 
2019- it had 55 Brisbane-based staff and around 35,000 customers.
2022 - SkyMesh acquires Clear Networks and the satellite customers from Uniti Group Limited, taking total customer numbers to 56,000. 
2022 - SkyMesh parent company, Bigblu Broadband PLC, appoints telco industry entrepreneur Paul Torrisi as Non-Executive Director to boost the companies growth ambitions using his experience in mergers and acquisitions and telecommunications technologies

In the News
In 2017, satellite broadband operator Ipstar was ordered by an Australian court to pay back $5.2 million to SkyMesh against three separate claims. SkyMesh was Ipstar's second largest ISP at that time, using Ipstar's satellite to provide broadband connections to rural Australia. Ipstar appealed but the damages were upheld.

References

External links

Companies based in Brisbane
Internet service providers of Australia
2005 establishments in Australia